.lb is the Internet country code top-level domain (ccTLD) for Lebanon.

The official registration rules say that it is necessary to have a Lebanese trademark certificate for the exact name being registered (omitting the TLD and second-level label the name is being registered within) and the trademark owner must be a Lebanese entity.

Registrants in each of the subdomains (.com.lb, .edu.lb, etc.) are expected to show qualifications indicating that they are the appropriate type of entity to register in that subdomain.  Additionally, registered names are required to be unique within the entire .lb domain (for instance, example.com.lb and example.org.lb cannot both be registered) because the registry wishes to keep the possibility open to drop the requirement of third-level registration and move all names to the second level.

Second-level domains 

 com.lb – commercial
 edu.lb – educational
 gov.lb – government
 net.lb – network infrastructure
 org.lb – organizations

References

External links 
 IANA .lb whois information

Country code top-level domains
Communications in Lebanon
Computer-related introductions in 1993

sv:Toppdomän#L